Geldhung is a mountain of the Garhwal Himalaya in Uttarakhand India. It is situated in the Kamet range. It is 146th highest located entirely within the Uttrakhand. Nanda Devi, is the highest mountain in this category. It lies 11 km SSE of Ganesh Parbat  . Bidhan Parbat  lies 12 km WSW and It lies 19.8 km ESE of Kamet . It lies 19.5 km East of Mana NW .

Climbing history
Geldhung was first climbed by a team from Durgapur, "The Durgapur Mountaineering Association". The trek started from Malari and established their Base Camp at Patalpani. On September 7, 1975, they climbed this virgin peak. The summiters were Sibapada Chakraborty, Amit Sinha, Dipak Pal and two Sherpas.

Neighboring and subsidiary peaks
Neighboring or subsidiary peaks of Geldhung:
 Kamet: 
 Mana Peak: 
 Mana Northwest: 
 Bidhan: 
 Mandir Parbat: 
 Gauri Parbat 
 Rataban 
 Nilgiri Parbat 
 Hathi Parbat

Glaciers and rivers
The near by Glaciers are Raikana Glacier, Uttari Raikana Glacier, Ganesh Glacier and Purbi Kamet Glacier from there emerges the river Dhauli Ganga which met Alaknanda river at Vishnu Prayag an 82 km journey from its mouth. Alaknanda river is one of the main tributaries of river Ganga which later joins the other main tributaries Bhagirathi river at Dev Prayag and became Ganga there after.

See also

 List of Himalayan peaks of Uttarakhand

References

Mountains of Uttarakhand
Six-thousanders of the Himalayas
Geography of Chamoli district